Igor Pokrajac (born 2 January 1979) is a Croatian mixed martial artist, who formerly competed in the Light Heavyweight division of the Ultimate Fighting Championship. A professional competitor since 2003, Pokrajac has also formerly competed for K-1, KSW, It's Showtime, and Jungle Fight promotions.

Mixed martial arts career

Early career
Pokrajac started his professional MMA career in 2003, primarily competing in his native Croatia. Over the next six years, he compiled an impressive record of 21–5.

Ultimate Fighting Championship
In August 2009, it was announced he had signed with the UFC, with his first fight taking place against Vladimir Matyushenko on September 19, 2009 at UFC 103. He lost the fight via unanimous decision.

Pokrajac next faced James Te-Huna on February 21, 2010 at UFC 110. Pokrajac lost again, this time via third-round TKO, due to strikes. This loss was somewhat controversial, as Te Huna had Pokrajac in a modified crucifix position on the mat and landed five to six clean shots to Pokrajac's face and although Pokrajac was not able to defend himself from this position, he was signalling to the referee that he was okay, although the ref did not acknowledge this, and stopped the fight after the unanswered shots from Te Huna. Although visibly dazed, Pokrajac disputed the stoppage directly after the fight to no avail.

Pokrajac then faced James Irvin on August 1, 2010 at UFC on Versus 2. Midway through the first round, Pokrajac took Irvin down and immediately got side control on the floor. After taking multiple strikes, Irvin rolled over and was submitted by a rear naked choke, handing Pokrajac his first UFC victory.

Pokrajac fought Stephan Bonnar on December 4, 2010 at The Ultimate Fighter 12 Finale. Pokrajac lost a unanimous decision.

Pokrajac defeated Todd Brown on March 3, 2011 at UFC Live: Sanchez vs. Kampmann by TKO at the conclusion of the first round. Brown was dropped by a knee in the final minute and hit with several clean follow up shots, being saved by the end of the round. When the fighters went back to their corners, Brown was unable to stand on his own power and the fight was stopped.

Pokrajac was expected to face Krzysztof Soszynski on June 11, 2011 at UFC 131, replacing an injured Anthony Perosh.  However, Pokrajac was himself forced out of the bout with an injury and replaced by returning UFC veteran Mike Massenzio.

Pokrajac/Soszynski ultimately took place on December 10, 2011 at UFC 140. Pokrajac defeated Soszynski via first-round KO.

Pokrajac was expected to face Thiago Silva on May 15, 2012 at UFC on Fuel TV: Korean Zombie vs. Poirier, replacing an injured Brandon Vera.  However, Silva was pulled from the bout to face Alexander Gustafsson on April 14, 2012 at UFC on Fuel TV 2 after Gustafsson's original opponent Antônio Rogério Nogueira pulled out of the bout citing an injury. Pokrajac instead faced Fábio Maldonado at the event. He won the fight via unanimous decision (29–28, 30–27, and 29–28).

Pokrajac was defeated by Vinny Magalhães via second round armbar on September 22, 2012 at UFC 152.

Pokrajac next faced Joey Beltran on December 15, 2012 at UFC on FX 6, replacing an injured Anthony Perosh. Pokrajac lost the fight via unanimous decision.  However, on January 10, 2013, it was announced that Beltran had failed his post fight drug test, testing positive for nandrolone and the result of the bout was changed to No Contest.

Pokrajac faced Ryan Jimmo at UFC 161 in Winnipeg, Manitoba on June 15, 2013. He lost the fight via unanimous decision.

Pokrajac faced Rafael Cavalcante on November 9, 2013 at UFC Fight Night 32. He lost via submission due to strikes in the first round.

Pokrajac faced Marcos Rogério de Lima on December 20, 2014 at UFC Fight Night 58. He lost the fight via TKO in the first round, and was subsequently released from the promotion shortly after.

Post UFC
After being released from Ultimate Fighting Championship Pokrajac signed for Croatia's Final Fight Championship promotion. His debut was expected to be against Maciej Browarski, but he was replaced and he will now make his debout in heavyweight division against Archontis Taxiarchis at FFC 18 - Ljubljana on 17 April 2015. He weighted 102 kg at official weight ins.

Second UFC stint
After recording three first round stoppage victories on the regional circuit across the Balkans, Pokrajac was re-signed for a second stint in the UFC. He faced Jan Błachowicz on April 10, 2016 at UFC Fight Night 86. Pokrajac lost the fight via unanimous decision.

Pokrajac was expected to face Ed Herman on March 4, 2017 at UFC 209. However, Pokrajac pulled out of the fight in early February citing an injury, and was replaced by Gadzhimurad Antigulov.

On May 4, 2019, it was reported that Pokrajac was released by UFC.

Accomplishments and championships
 Serbian Battle Championship 
SBC Light Heavyweight Championship (one time)

Mixed martial arts record

|-
|Loss
|align=center|29–15 (1)
|Michał Kita
|TKO (punches)
|FEN 28 - Lotos Fight Night
|
|align=center|1
|align=center|0:37
|Lublin, Poland
|
|-
|Win
|align=center|29–14 (1)
|Maiquel Falcão
|TKO (elbows and punches)
|Serbian Battle Championship 25
|
|align=center|1
|align=center|3:24
|Novi Sad, Serbia
|
|-
|Loss
|align=center|28–14 (1)
|Maiquel Falcão
|TKO (punches)
|Serbian Battle Championship 21
|
|align=center|1
|align=center|4:55
|Odžaci, Serbia
|
|-
|Loss
|align=center|28–13 (1)
|Jan Błachowicz
|Decision (unanimous)
|UFC Fight Night: Rothwell vs. dos Santos
|
|align=center|3
|align=center|5:00
|Zagreb, Croatia
|
|-
|  Win
| align=center| 28–12 (1) 
| Zauri Maisuradze
| Submission (armbar)
| FFC 20: Zagreb
| 
| align=center| 1
| align=center| 1:16
| Zagreb, Croatia
|
|-
|  Win
| align=center| 27–12 (1) 
| Rudolf Pavlin
| TKO (elbows)
| Montenegro Fighting Championship 3
| 
| align=center| 1
| align=center| 2:35
| Budva, Montenegro
| 
|-
|  Win
| align=center| 26–12 (1) 
| Archontis Taxiarchis
| TKO (punches)
| FFC 18: Ljubljana
| 
| align=center| 1
| align=center| 3:03
| Ljubljana, Slovenia
| 
|-
| Loss
| align=center| 25–12 (1) 
| Marcos Rogério de Lima
| TKO (punches)
| UFC Fight Night: Machida vs. Dollaway
| 
| align=center| 1
| align=center| 1:59
| Barueri, Brazil
|
|-
| Loss
| align=center| 25–11 (1)
| Rafael Cavalcante
| TKO (submission to knees and punches)
| UFC Fight Night: Belfort vs. Henderson
| 
| align=center| 1
| align=center| 1:18
| Goiânia, Brazil
| 
|-
| Loss
| align=center| 25–10 (1)
| Ryan Jimmo
| Decision (unanimous)
| UFC 161
| 
| align=center| 3
| align=center| 5:00
| Winnipeg, Manitoba, Canada
| 
|-
| NC
| align=center| 25–9 (1)
| Joey Beltran
| NC (overturned)
| UFC on FX: Sotiropoulos vs. Pearson
| 
| align=center| 3
| align=center| 5:00
| Gold Coast, Australia
| 
|-
| Loss 
| align=center| 25–9
| Vinny Magalhães
| Submission (armbar)
| UFC 152
| 
| align=center| 2
| align=center| 1:14
| Toronto, Ontario, Canada
| 
|-
| Win
| align=center| 25–8
| Fábio Maldonado
| Decision (unanimous)
| UFC on Fuel TV: Korean Zombie vs. Poirier
| 
| align=center| 3
| align=center| 5:00
| Fairfax, Virginia, United States
| 
|-
| Win
| align=center| 24–8
| Krzysztof Soszynski
| KO (punches)
| UFC 140
| 
| align=center| 1
| align=center| 0:35
| Toronto, Ontario, Canada
| 
|-
| Win
| align=center| 23–8
| Todd Brown
| TKO (knee and punches)
| UFC Live: Sanchez vs. Kampmann
| 
| align=center| 1
| align=center| 5:00
| Louisville, Kentucky, United States
| 
|-
| Loss
| align=center| 22–8
| Stephan Bonnar
| Decision (unanimous)
| The Ultimate Fighter: Team GSP vs. Team Koscheck Finale
| 
| align=center| 3
| align=center| 5:00
| Las Vegas, Nevada, United States
| 
|-
| Win
| align=center| 22–7
| James Irvin
| Submission (rear-naked choke)
| UFC Live: Jones vs. Matyushenko
| 
| align=center| 1
| align=center| 2:28
| San Diego, California, United States
| 
|-
| Loss
| align=center| 21–7
| James Te Huna
| TKO (punches)
| UFC 110
| 
| align=center| 3
| align=center| 3:26
| Sydney, Australia
| 
|-
|  Loss
| align=center| 21–6
| Vladimir Matyushenko
| Decision (unanimous)
| UFC 103
| 
| align=center| 3
| align=center| 5:00
| Dallas, Texas, United States
| 
|-
|  Win
| align=center| 21–5
| Kalvis Gebauers
| TKO (punches)
| WFC 8: D-Day
| 
| align=center| 1
| align=center| 1:16
| Ljubljana, Slovenia
| 
|-
|  Win
| align=center| 20–5
| Roderik Jambor
| TKO (punches and elbows)
| K-1 ColliZion 2009 Croatia
| 
| align=center| 1
| align=center| 1:09
| Split, Croatia
| 
|-
|  Win
| align=center| 19–5
| Mihajlo Fincur
| TKO (punches)
| Grand Fight
| 
| align=center| 1
| align=center| 3:59
| Varaždin, Croatia
| 
|-
|  Win
| align=center| 18–5
| Patrik Javicky
| Submission (rear-naked choke)
| Ultimate Fight: Challenge 3
| 
| align=center| 1
| align=center| 1:42
| Samobor, Croatia
| 
|-
|  Win
| align=center| 17–5
| Jan Antoska
| Submission (armbar)
| Hell Cage 1
| 
| align=center| 2
| align=center| 3:39
| Prague, Czech Republic
| 
|-
|  Win
| align=center| 16–5
| Martin Zawada
| Submission (rear-naked choke)
| Balans: It’s Showtime 75MAX Trophy Final 2008
| 
| align=center| 1
| align=center| 1:01
| 's-Hertogenbosch, Netherlands
| 
|-
|  Win
| align=center| 15–5
| Marko Sintic
| TKO (punches)
| Ultimate Fight: Challenge 2
| 
| align=center| 2
| align=center| 2:00
| Samobor, Croatia
| 
|-
|  Win
| align=center| 14–5
| Ladislav Zak
| Decision (unanimous)
| OB-Gula: Fight Night
| 
| align=center| 3
| align=center| 5:00
| Ogulin, Croatia
| 
|-
|  Loss
| align=center| 13–5
| Mamed Khalidov
| Submission (kneebar)
| Boxing Explosion 2
| 
| align=center| 2
| align=center| 0:55
| Pag, Croatia
| 
|-
|  Win
| align=center| 13–4
| Bojan Spalevic
| TKO (elbows)
| Osijek Challenge 07
| 
| align=center| 1
| align=center| 0:43
| Osijek, Croatia
| 
|-
|  Win
| align=center| 12–4
| Slaven Planinic
| TKO (knee and punches)
| Bilic Fight Night
| 
| align=center| 1
| align=center| 3:09
| Zagreb, Croatia
| 
|-
|  Win
| align=center| 11–4
| Sasa Lazic
| Submission (armbar)
| Noc Gladiatora 1
| 
| align=center| 1
| align=center| 2:02
| Karlovac, Croatia
| 
|-
|  Loss
| align=center| 10–4
| Assuerio Silva
| Decision (split)
| Jungle Fight Europe
| 
| align=center| 3
| align=center| 5:00
| Ljubljana, Slovenia
| 
|-
|  Win
| align=center| 10–3
| Ivan Brguljan
| Decision (unanimous)
| International Fight Night
| 
| align=center| 1
| align=center| 4:01
| Opatija, Croatia
| 
|-
|  Win
| align=center| 9–3
| Lukasz Jurkowski
| Decision (split)
| Sukosan Fight Night
| 
| align=center| 2
| align=center| 1:41
| Sukošan, Croatia
| 
|-
|  Win
| align=center| 8–3
| Jure Lucic
| Submission (armbar)
| Ultimate Nokaut 4
| 
| align=center| 1
| align=center| 3:19
| Karlovac, Croatia
| 
|-
|  Win
| align=center| 7–3
| Ivan Bacic
| Submission (rear-naked choke)
| Ultimate Nokaut 3
| 
| align=center| 1
| align=center| 0:59
| Rijeka, Croatia
| 
|-
|  Loss
| align=center| 6–3
| Lukasz Jurkowski
| TKO (corner stoppage)
| KSW IV: Konfrontacja
| 
| align=center| 2
| align=center| 5:00
| Warsaw, Poland
| 
|-
|  Win
| align=center| 6–2
| Branislav Zeman
| Submission (rear-naked choke)
| Ultimate Nokaut 2
| 
| align=center| 2
| align=center| 2:49
| Zadar, Croatia
| 
|-
|  Loss
| align=center| 5–2
| Miodrag Petkovic
| TKO (punches)
| Ultimate Nokaut 1
| 
| align=center| 2
| align=center| 4:51
| Karlovac, Croatia
| 
|-
|  Win
| align=center| 5–1
| Peter Cakic
| TKO (punches and elbows)
| Trboulje 2: Croatia vs Slovenia
| 
| align=center| 1
| align=center| 2:25
| Trbovlje, Slovenia
| 
|-
|  Loss
| align=center| 4–1
| Miodrag Petkovic
| KO (punches)
| Ultimate Fight Dubravc
| 
| align=center| 2
| align=center| 3:21
| Zagreb, Croatia
| 
|-
|  Win
| align=center| 4–0
| Andre Castro
| KO (knee)
| DF: Durata World Grand Prix 1
| 
| align=center| 1
| align=center| 2:00
| Zagreb, Croatia
| 
|-
|  Win
| align=center| 3–0
| Matthias Riccio
| TKO (doctor stoppage)
| DF: Durata World Grand Prix 1
| 
| align=center| 1
| align=center| 4:00
| Zagreb, Croatia
| 
|-
|  Win
| align=center| 2–0
| Pavel Botka
| TKO (punches)
| DF: Durata World Grand Prix 1
| 
| align=center| 1
| align=center| 4:00
| Zagreb, Croatia
| 
|-
|  Win
| align=center| 1–0
| Nik Peric
| TKO (knees)
| Strabag Free Fight
| 
| align=center| 1
| align=center| 1:33
| Rijeka, Croatia
|

References

External links

Official UFC Profile

1979 births
Living people
Sportspeople from Zagreb
Croatian practitioners of Brazilian jiu-jitsu
Croatian male mixed martial artists
Light heavyweight mixed martial artists
Ultimate Fighting Championship male fighters